The Bear River Band of the Rohnerville Rancheria is a federally recognized tribe of Mattole, Bear River and Wiyot people in Humboldt County, California.

Government
The Bear River Band is headquartered in Loleta, California. Tribal enrollment is based on residency on the Rohnerville Rancheria from 1910 to 1960 or being a lineal descent of those residents.

Reservation and traditional territories

The Rohnerville Rancheria is a federally recognized ranchería located in two separate parts. One is at the eastern edge of Fortuna, and the other to the southeast of Loleta, both in Humboldt County. As of the 2010 Census the population was 38.

The tribe's traditional territory was along the Mattole and Bear Rivers near Cape Mendocino. Wiyot people lived along the Little River down to the Bear River and  eastward. The Mattole villages of Tcalko', Chilsheck, Selsche'ech, Tlanko, Estakana, and Sehtla were located along Bear River.

Economic development
The Bear River Band owns and operates several entities including Bear River Casino Resort, River's Edge Restaurant, the Thirsty Bear Lounge, Bear River Recreation Center, and Bear River Tobacco Traders all located in Loleta, California. The new Bear River Family Entertainment Center that includes a 10 lane bowling alley, arcade, and laser tag and tournament baseball field open to the public, located next to the Bear River Recreation Center.

Traditional culture
Mattole people differ from neighboring tribes because men traditionally tattooed their faces, instead of just women. Mattole spoke the Mattole language, an Athapaskan language, while Wiyots spoke the Wiyot language, an Algonquian language. Subsistence practices that continue today g Tribal Marine Resource Use into the Marine Life Protection Act.'' Retrieved 25 June 2012.</ref>

References

External links

 Bear River Band of the Rohnerville Rancheria, official website
 Wiyot Tribe
 , Four Directions Institute
 , Four Directions Institute

Native American tribes in California
Federally recognized tribes in the United States
Wiyot tribe
Native Americans in Humboldt County, California